Suzanne McClelland (born 1948) was Miss Australia 1969.

McClelland was trained as a classical ballerina by Kathleen Gorham, but had to stop due to a foot injury.

References

Living people
Australian beauty pageant winners
1948 births